The Francis Beidler Forest is an Audubon wildlife sanctuary in Four Holes Swamp, a blackwater creek system in South Carolina, United States. It is the largest virgin stand of cypress-tupelo forest in the world, with some Bald Cypress trees over 1,000 years old. It is a favorite haunt of birdwatchers and is used for biological research projects by area schools.

The preserve was established to protect one of only two stands of old-growth forest in South Carolina. On May 30, 2008 the forest was designated a Ramsar Wetland of International Importance. It was designated a National Natural Landmark in 1979. In 2020, Four Holes Swamp was designated a site on the National Park Service's Underground Railroad - Network to Freedom program.

History 
The land was acquired by Francis Beidler in the 1890s, and maintained by his family after his death in 1924. On liquidation of the estate, the National Audubon Society raised the funds to acquire the land, built a boardwalk, and purchase land from surrounding farmers to ensure access.  In 2003 the Audubon Society, which maintains the preserve, announced it had recently obtained funding with which to purchase an additional 909 acres of adjacent land to expand the preserve. Other similar adjacent lands have been protected to total over 18,000 acres as of 2021.

Facilities 
It has an environmental education center and a  boardwalk trail through the old-growth portion of the swamp, established in 1977. During the spring, there are guided canoe trips in the swamp, which offer a different perspective as one paddles through the shallow channels and among the cypress knees. Night walks are also offered on a monthly basis. A new woodland and grassland trail system was opened in 2020. These trails are accessed by a gravel parking lot adjacent to the entrance gate at Beidler; the trails are open every day from sunrise to sunset. Visit https://beidler.audubon.org/ for more information about current hours and programs.

Location 
336 Sanctuary Road, Harleyville, South Carolina 29448

See also
List of National Natural Landmarks in South Carolina

References

Sources 
 National Recreation Trails: Francis Beidler Forest
 Southern Forests: Francis Beidler Forest
 Text of The Francis Beidler Forest in Four Holes Swamp
 Francis Beidler - text from guidebook

External links
 Audubon Center at Francis Beidler Forest web page
 iPhone/iPod Touch app iTunes Store

Protected areas of Berkeley County, South Carolina
Protected areas of Dorchester County, South Carolina
National Natural Landmarks in South Carolina
Protected areas of Orangeburg County, South Carolina
Nature reserves in South Carolina
Nature centers in South Carolina
Forests of South Carolina
Education in Dorchester County, South Carolina
National Audubon Society
Ramsar sites in the United States
Wetlands of South Carolina
Landforms of Berkeley County, South Carolina
Landforms of Dorchester County, South Carolina
Landforms of Orangeburg County, South Carolina